The Snizort Free Church, is a place of worship of the Free Church of Scotland (Continuing) in the township of Skeabost in Snizort on the island of Skye.

External links
 The chapel on www.britishlistedbuildings.co.uk

Churches in the Isle of Skye